Rake may refer to:
 Rake (stock character), a man habituated to immoral conduct
 Rake (theatre), the artificial slope of a theatre stage

Science and technology
 Rake receiver, a radio receiver
 Rake (geology), the angle between a feature on a bedding plane and the strike line in geology

Tools
 Rake (tool), a horticultural implement, a long-handled tool with tines
 Fire rake, a heavy-duty variant of the “normal” rake, used for fire prevention
 Rake or hay rake, a farm implement
 Rake angle, a parameter in machining and cutting geometry
 Mash rake, a tool used in brewing

Transport
 Rake, the caster angle of a bicycle or motorcycle
 Rake, the difference between the front and rear ride heights of a car
 Rake (train), a line of coupled passenger coaches, or freight wagons, or railcars (excluding the locomotive) that typically move together

Mathematics and computing
 Rake (angle), mathematical definition
 Rake (cellular automaton), a cellular automaton pattern that moves while regularly emitting spaceships
 Rake (poker), the commission taken by a casino when hosting a poker game
 Rake (software), a variant of the make program coded in the Ruby programming language

Arts

Architecture
Rake (architecture), the slope of the roof at the end of a gable

Television

 Rake (Australian TV series), an Australian television series that commenced airing in 2010
 Rake (U.S. TV series), an American adaptation of the Australian series of the same name that commenced airing in 2014

Place names
 Rake, Iowa, a small town in the United States
 Rake, West Sussex, a village in England
 Rake, Kostel, a settlement in the Kostel municipality in Slovenia

People
 Rake Yohn, a member of the CKY and Jackass crews
 Rake (singer), a Japanese singer-songwriter
 The Rake of Rivera, a nickname for the Italian tycoon Gianni Agnelli

Other uses
 Raking fire, fire along the axis of a ship in naval warfare
 Another name for the Hooker position in rugby league football
 A lock picking technique in which a lock pick is slid outwards from the back of a lock to push its pins up
 The Rake, a fictional creature featured in many Creepypasta stories
 Raking, a nickname for a home run

See also

 Reiki, a form of alternative medicine
 Raking, a weighting method in statistics